The governor of Zaporizhzhia Oblast is the head of state administration for the Zaporizhzhia Oblast.

The office of governor is an appointed position, with officeholders being appointed by the president of Ukraine, on recommendation from the prime minister of Ukraine, to serve a four-year term.

The official residence for the governor is located in Zaporizhzhia.

Governors

Chairman of Executive Committee of Zaporizhzhia Oblast
 Danylo Lezhenko (1939)
 Zakhar Dorofeyev (1940–1941)
 Nazi German occupation (1941–1943)
 Zakhar Dorofeyev (1943–1944)
 Vasyl Ponomarenko (1944–1950)
 Mykola Titov (1950–1951)
 Vasyl Ponomarenko (1951–1952)
 Volodymyr Skryabin (1952–1957)
 Fedir Mokrous (1957–1963) 
 Oleksandr Guyva (1963–1964)         
 Pavlo Sklyarov (1963–1964)
 Fedir Mokrous (1964–1969)
 Mykhailo Khorunzhy (1969–1976)
 Petro Moskalkov (1976–1988)
 Volodymyr Demyanov (1988–1992)

Representatives of the President
 Volodymyr Demyanov (1992)
 Yurii Bochkarev (1992–1994)

Chairman of the Executive Committee
 Vyacheslav Pokhvalsky (1994–1995)

Heads of the Administration
 Vyacheslav Pokhvalsky (1995–1998)
 Volodymyr Kuratchenko (1998–1999)
 Yevhen Kartashov (1999)
 Volodymyr Kuratchenko (1999–2000)
 Oleksii Kucherenko (2000–2001)
 Serhiy Sazonov (2001) (acting)
 Yevhen Kartashov (2001–2003)
 Volodymyr Berezovsky (2003–2005)
 Yuriy Artemenko (2005)
 Anatolii Holovko (2005) (acting)
 Yevhen Chervonenko (2005–2007)
 Valery Cherkaska (2007–2008) (acting)
 Oleksandr Starukh (2008–2010)
 Borys Petrov (2010–2011)
 Oleksandr Peklushenko (2011–2014)
 Valery Baranov (2014)
 Valentyn Reznichenko (2014–2015)
 Hryhoriy Samardak (06.04.2015–18.12.2015)
 Konstantyn Bryl (2016–2019)
 Ella Slepyan (11.06.2019–05.09.2019) (acting)
 Vitaliy Turynok (2019–2020)
 Vitaliy Bohovin (2020)
 Oleksandr Starukh (2020–2023)
 Yuriy Malashko (2023–present)

Notes

See also
 Zaporizhzhia Regional Committee of the Communist Party of Ukraine

References

External links
Government of Zaporizhzhia Oblast in Ukrainian
 World Statesmen.org

 
Zaporizhia Oblast